Do Hwa-Sung (born 27 June 1980) is a South Korean football player. He related match-fixing scandal and his football career was rescinded.

He record the most longest distance goal in K-league (65 meter)

Club history
 2003-2008 : Busan I'Park
 2009-2010 : Incheon United

References

South Korean footballers
Association football midfielders
Busan IPark players
Incheon United FC players
K League 1 players
1980 births
Living people